Franklin Lindsay Forbes (March 30, 1891 – August 19, 1983) was a Negro league infielder for several years before the founding of the first Negro National League, and was an American football and basketball coach.

Biography
Nicknamed "Strangler" and sometimes appearing as "Joe" Forbes, he played for his hometown team Philadelphia Giants at the age of 22. He moved on to the Lincoln Stars and Lincoln Giants for a number of years before returning to Pennsylvania.

In 1917, 26 year-old Forbes registered for the WWI draft. He listed his occupation as a porter for the Pennsylvania Railroad. He was listed as married. He also listed his home address as 200 N. 131st Street in New York City as his home address. And he listed his mother and wife as dependents.

Forbes served three stints as the head football coach (1932–1933, 1935–1942, 1945–1949) at Morehouse College in Atlanta, Georgia. Morehouse's Forbes Arena is named after him.

Forbes died at the age of 92 in his hometown of Philadelphia in 1983.

References

External links

1891 births
1983 deaths
Morehouse Maroon Tigers basketball coaches
Morehouse Maroon Tigers football coaches
Lincoln Giants players
Philadelphia Giants players
Bacharach Giants players
Pennsylvania Red Caps of New York players
New York Renaissance players
African-American coaches of American football
Basketball coaches from Pennsylvania
African-American baseball players
African-American basketball coaches
Morehouse College faculty
20th-century African-American sportspeople
Baseball players from Philadelphia
South Philadelphia High School alumni